This is a list of members of the Belgian Chamber of Representatives during the 51st legislature (2003–2007).

Election results (18 May 2003)

By party

Dutch-speaking

Christian Democratic and Flemish (21)

Flemish Interest (18)

Flemish Liberals and Democrats (25)

New Flemish Alliance (1)

Socialist Party–Different / Spirit (23)

French-speaking

Ecolo (4)

Humanist Democratic Centre (7)

National Front (1)

Reformist Movement (25)

Socialist Party (25)

Lists of members of the Chamber of Representatives (Belgium)
2000s in Belgium